Begin (stylized in all caps) is a Japanese manga series written by Sho Fumimura and illustrated by Ryoichi Ikegami. It was serialized in Shogakukan's seinen manga magazine Big Comic Superior from October 2016 to January 2020, with its chapters collected in nine tankōbon volumes.

Publication
Written by Sho Fumimura and illustrated by Ryoichi Ikegami, Begin was serialized in Shogakukan's seinen manga magazine Big Comic Superior from October 14, 2016, to January 10, 2020. Shogakukan collected its chapters in nine tankōbon volumes, released from July 28, 2017, to March 30, 2020.

Volume list

References

External links
 

Seinen manga
Shogakukan manga
Yoshiyuki Okamura